Vairis Leiboms (born 18 August 1991) is a Latvian bobsledder. He was born in Ergli. He competed at the 2014 Winter Olympics in Sochi, in two-man and four-man bobsleigh.

References 

1991 births
Living people
Bobsledders at the 2014 Winter Olympics
Latvian male bobsledders
Olympic bobsledders of Latvia